Group Captain John Evelyn Grindon,  (30 September 1917 – 11 November 2001) was a senior Royal Air Force officer. He served as a bomber pilot in the Second World War, and later commanded the Queen's Flight.

Grindon was the son of Thomas Edward Grindon, a First World War casualty, and Dora Eastlake. He married Miss Hubber in 1937.

A portrait is held by the National Portrait Gallery.

References

1917 births
2001 deaths
British World War II bomber pilots
Commanders of the Royal Victorian Order
Companions of the Distinguished Service Order
Recipients of the Air Force Cross (United Kingdom)
Royal Air Force officers